The 2019 Moroccan Throne Cup was the 63rd staging of the Moroccan Throne Cup, the main knockout football tournament in Morocco. TAS de Casablanca became the champions by beating Hassania Agadir with 2–1 in the final. For the first time in the history of the tournament, VAR was used (only from the semi-finals onwards).

Fourth round
The fourth round was played on 4 May 2019.

|}

Final phase

Qualified teams
16 teams of 2018–19 Botola

AS FAR
Chabab Rif Hoceima
Difaâ El Jadidi
FUS Rabat
Hassania Agadir
IR Tanger
Kawkab Marrakech
Moghreb Tétouan
Mouloudia Oujda
Olympic Safi
Olympique Khouribga
Raja Casablanca
Rapide Oued Zem
RSB Berkane
Wydad Casablanca
Youssoufia Berrechid

10 teams of 2018–19 Botola 2

AS Salé
Chabab Atlas Khénifra
Jeunesse Sportive Soualem
Ittihad Khemisset
JS de Kasbah Tadla
Olympique Dcheira
Racing de Casablanca
Raja Beni Mellal
Nahdat Zemamra
Wydad de Fès

4 teams of 2018–19 Division Nationale

Fath Ouislane
SCC Mohammédia
TAS de Casablanca
US Musulmane d'Oujda

2 teams of 2018–19 Championnat du Maroc Amateurs I

Nasma Sportif Settat
Union de Touarga

Bracket
Draw of the 2018–19 Moroccan Throne Cup final phase

Round of 32
The Round of 32 matches were played on 30 and 31 August 2019, 1 and 24 September 2019.

Round of 16 
The Round of 16 matches were played on 25, 27 September and 2 October 2019.

Quarter-finals
The quarter-finals were played on 22, 23  and 24 October 2019.

Semi-finals 
The semi-finals were played on 9 and 10 November 2019.

Final 
<onlyinclude>

References

External links
Moroccan Cup 2018 - 2019, Goalzz.com

Morocco
Coupe
Coupe